Abraham is a saint of the Ethiopian Orthodox Tewahedo Church. His feast day is celebrated May 5.

References

Sources
Holweck, F. G. A Biographical Dictionary of the Saints. St. Louis, MO: B. Herder Book Co. 1924.

Christian saints in unknown century
Year of birth missing
Year of death missing
Ethiopian saints